The 2008 South Carolina Gamecocks football team represented the University of South Carolina in the 2008 NCAA Division I FBS football season. The team's head coach was Steve Spurrier, who served his fourth season at USC. The Gamecocks played their home games at Williams-Brice Stadium in Columbia, South Carolina.

Preseason
Carolina had their first spring practice on March 21, 2008. It was the first of 15 spring practice sessions for the Gamecocks, who return 54 lettermen in Steve Spurrier's fourth season. The annual Garnet & Black Spring Game was scheduled for 1:00 p.m., Saturday, April 19.

Schedule

Radio coverage for all games was provided by the Gamecock Sports Radio Network.

Game summaries

North Carolina State

Vanderbilt

Georgia

Wofford

UAB

Mississippi

Kentucky

LSU

Tennessee

Arkansas

Florida

Clemson

Players

Depth chart 

These are the projected starters and primary backups for the Outback Bowl on January 1, 2009.

Key Committed Freshmen

Antonio Allen – DB
Akeem Auguste – DB
Eric Baker – RB
Reggie Bowens – LB
Jarrett Burns – ATH
Ronald Byrd – DL
Kenny Davis – DL
Aramis Hillary – QB
T.J. Johnson – OL
Jarriel King – DL
Reid McCollum – QB
Kenneth Miles – RB
D.L. Moore – WR
Darrell Simmons - DB
Jay Spearman – DB
Chaz Sutton – DL
Devin Taylor – DL
Mike Triglia – TE
Charles Whitlock – DB/WR
Elliot Williams - OL
LaCharles Lindsey - WR

Roster

Awards

Rankings

Statistics

Team

Scores by quarter

Offense

Rushing

Passing

Receiving

Defense

Special teams

Coaching staff
Steve Spurrier - Head Coach
Ellis Johnson - Defensive Coordinator/Linebackers & Assistant Head Coach
Shane Beamer - Cornerbacks
Ron Cooper- Safeties
Robert Gillespie- Running Backs
John Hunt- Offensive Line
Brad Lawing - Defensive Line
David Reaves - Quarterbacks & Recruiting Coordinator 
Ray Rychleski - Special Teams
Steve Spurrier, Jr. - Wide Receivers

References

South Carolina
South Carolina Gamecocks football seasons
South Carolina Gamecocks football